Rodney Larece Heath is a former professional American football player who played cornerback for four seasons for the Cincinnati Bengals and Atlanta Falcons. He also played one season with the Hamilton Tiger-Cats of the Canadian Football League. Rodney is currently a successful Ohio High School Football coach, he is a coach at Lakota East High School in Liberty Township, Ohio. He also coaches and trains some of Southwestern Ohio's top athletes in Track and Field. He can be seen on WLWT Sports Rock and WCPO Sports of All Sorts on Sunday nights.

1974 births
Living people
Players of American football from Cincinnati
American football cornerbacks
Minnesota Golden Gophers football players
Cincinnati Bengals players
Atlanta Falcons players
Players of Canadian football from Cincinnati